is a passenger railway station in located in the town of  Aishō,  Shiga Prefecture, Japan, operated by the private railway operator Ohmi Railway.

Lines
Echigawa Station is served by the Ohmi Railway Main Line, and is located 17.9 rail kilometers from the terminus of the line at Maibara Station.

Station layout
The station consists of two unnumbered side platforms connected to the station building by a level crossing.

Platforms

Adjacent stations

History
Echigawa Station was opened on June 11, 1898. The station building was reconstructed in 2000.

Surroundings
 Aishō Town Hall
 Aishō Municipal Eichigawa Library
 Aishō Municipal Aishō Junior High School
 Shiga Prefectural Echi High School
 Nakasendō Echigawa-juku
 Tōkaidō Shinkansen

See also
List of railway stations in Japan

References

External links

Ohmi Railway official site  

Railway stations in Shiga Prefecture
Railway stations in Japan opened in 1898
Aisho, Shiga